The Evergreen L class is a series of 30 container ships built for Evergreen Marine. The ships were built by Samsung Heavy Industries in Korea and CSBC Corporation in Taiwan. These ships have a maximum theoretical capacity of around 8,500 to 9,500 twenty-foot equivalent units (TEU).

Some of the ships have been upgraded, starting in 2019 with the Ever Laden. Major changes include the addition of an exhaust scrubber system and the raising of the deck house and lashing bridges. This allows containers to be stacked higher on deck, which increases the maximum number of containers which the ships can carry by about 1,000 TEU. The work was carried out at the Huarun Dadong Dockyard in China.

List of ships

References 

Container ship classes
Ships built by Samsung Heavy Industries